Meres Pou De Sou Eipa S' Agapo (English: Days I Didn't Tell You I Love You) is the second  studio album by Greek singer Giorgos Sabanis,  released on 04 May 2009 by Sony BMG Greece. The album contains 3 new songs and 6 songs from his first album Haramata. The songs "Meres Pou De Sou Eipa S' Agapo" and "Ti Na Mas Kanei I Nihta" were the most populars.

Track listing 
"Mia Zoi Tha 'mai Edo" (Μια Ζωή Θα 'μαι Εδώ; A Life Will Be Here) – 3:32
"Ti Na Mas Kanei I Nihta" Feat. Stereo Mike (Τι Να Μας Κάνει Η Νύχτα; What To Do In The Night) – 3:33
"Meres Pou De Sou Eipa S' Agapo" Duet with Rallia Hristidou (Μέρες Που Δε Σου Είπα Σ' Αγαπώ; Days I Didn't Tell You I Love You) – 3:20
"Meres Pou De Sou Eipa S' Agapo" (Remixed by MTV) Duet with Rallia Hristidou  – 3:19

Bonus Tracks
"Ase Na Peftei I Vrohi" (Άσε Να Πέφτει Η Βροχή; Let The Rain Fall) – 3:44
"Haramata" (Χαράματα; Dawn) – 4:35
"Pathos" (Πάθος; Passion) – 3:45
"Kapou Allou Ki Ohi Edo" (Κάπου Αλλού Κι Όχι Εδώ; Somewhere Else And Not Here) – 3:10
"Mia Fora Ki Ena Kairo" (Μια Φορά Κι Ένα Καιρό; Once Upon a Time) - 3:45
"S' Afino Ston Epomeno" (Σ' Αφήνω Στον Επόμενο; Let's Go Next) – 3:11

Personnel
Yannis Doxas – executive producer
Nikos Papadopoulos – photography
Antonis Glikos – artwork
Soumka – mastering

References

Greek-language albums
Sony Music Greece albums
2009 albums